Christian Bollini (born 15 August 1962) is a Sammarinese alpine skier. He competed in two events at the 1984 Winter Olympics.

References

1962 births
Living people
Sammarinese male alpine skiers
Olympic alpine skiers of San Marino
Alpine skiers at the 1984 Winter Olympics
Place of birth missing (living people)